Ilian Iliev (born 9 May 1973) is a Bulgarian former weightlifter. He competed in the men's featherweight event at the 1996 Summer Olympics.

References

1973 births
Living people
Bulgarian male weightlifters
Olympic weightlifters of Bulgaria
Weightlifters at the 1996 Summer Olympics
People from Yambol